The 2016 Women's World Nine-ball Championship was a professional nine-ball pool tournament which was held in Emeishan City/Sichuan from 10th to 16th November 2017. The event was organized by the Guoao Group, which has hosted this event from 2013.

Overall 64 players from all aroint the world was divided into 8 groups of 8 players, where double elimination format was applied. In the group stage all matches were race to 7 with alternate break format. Overall 32 players proceeded to the main tournament – knockout stage. In the knockout stage all matches were played race to 9.

The prize money for the event is shown below.

Main tournament - Last 32 
Knockout stage consisted of last 32 players. Defending champion Liu Shasha was defeated in Last16 by Gao Meng 7–9.

Source:

References

Pool (cue sports)